Boris Miličić (Serbian Cyrillic: Борис Миличић; born April 4, 1979) is a Serbian footballer who plays with Brantford Galaxy in the Canadian Soccer League.

Playing career
Miličić played with FK Mladost Apatin, FK Hajduk Kula, FK Veternik, FK Buducnost Banatski Dvor, and FK Javor Ivanjica in the Serbian First League. He played in the Serbian SuperLiga with FK Inđija. He played with Diósgyőri VTK in the Nemzeti Bajnokság I. He also had a stint in the Nemzeti Bajnokság II with Szolnoki MÁV FC. In 2011, he went overseas to Canada to sign with the Serbian White Eagles FC of the Canadian Soccer League. In 2014, he signed with the North York Astros, and helped the club secure a postseason berth by finishing fourth in the overall standings. After North York's departure from the CSL he signed with expansion franchise Scarborough SC. Midway through the season he was transferred to Brantford Galaxy.

References

1979 births
Living people
Serbian footballers
FK Mladost Apatin players
FK Hajduk Kula players
FK Javor Ivanjica players
Serbian White Eagles FC players
Serbian SuperLiga players
Diósgyőri VTK players
Canadian Soccer League (1998–present) players
Expatriate footballers in Hungary
Serbian expatriate sportspeople in Hungary
Association football defenders
FK Inđija players
FK Veternik players
Szolnoki MÁV FC footballers
North York Astros players
Scarborough SC players
Brantford Galaxy players
People from Vrbas, Serbia